Namus is an ethical category of respect and honor in some Middle Eastern societies.

Namus may also refer to:

 Namus (film), a 1925 Armenian silent film
 Naimon, alternately Namus, a character in the Matter of France literature
 National Missing and Unidentified Persons System (NaMUS), a system of databases in the US
 Waw An Namus, a volcanic field in Libya